Grandview Heights, Alberta may refer to:

Grandview Heights, Edmonton, a neighbourhood in Edmonton, Alberta
Grandview Heights, Sturgeon County, Alberta, a locality in Sturgeon County, Alberta
Grandview Heights, Wetaskiwin County No. 10, Alberta, a locality in Wetaskiwin County No. 10, Alberta

See also
Grandview Heights (disambiguation)